Caillac is a commune in the Lot department in south-western France.

Sites and monuments 
 The Romanesque church of Saint-Pierre-et-Saint-Paul de Caillac was classified as a monument historique in 1979
 Château Lagrézette, built during the Renaissance, stands in a vineyard and is the property of a famous French industrialist. It was classified as a monument historique in 1982.
 Since 2006, an artificial lake has been built in the town centre to develop fishing as a leisure activity.

Personalities linked to the commune 
 General Joachim Ambert (1804-1890), born in Château Lagrézette on 8 February 1804.
 Alain-Dominique Perrin, businessman, owner of Château Lagrézette since 1980.
 Tony Blair, while prime minister of the UK, stayed in Château Lagrézette in 2002.
 André Bergeron (1922-2014), secretary of Force Ouvrière.

See also
Communes of the Lot department

References

Communes of Lot (department)